is a former Japanese football player.

Club statistics

References

External links

1984 births
Living people
Fukuyama University alumni
Association football people from Okayama Prefecture
Japanese footballers
J2 League players
Japan Football League players
Sagawa Shiga FC players
Kataller Toyama players
Blaublitz Akita players
Association football midfielders